Put on Ice is a 1980 German thriller film directed by Bernhard Sinkel. It was entered into the 1980 Cannes Film Festival.

Cast
 Helmut Griem – Lehrer Brasch
 Martin Benrath – V-Mann Körner
 Ángela Molina – Franziska Schwarz
 Friedhelm Ptok – Herr Sokolowski
 Hans-Günter Martens – Herr Schröder
 Meret Becker – Anna
 Helga Koehler – Juliane Brasch
 Frank Schendler – Kapuste
 Thomas Kufahl – Schindler
 Peter Lustig – Schulleiter
 Hermann Steza
 Rudolf Unger
 Gerhard von Halem
 Jürgen Bieske
 Monika Hansen
 Michael Brennicke
 Michael Duffek

References

External links

1980 films
1980s political thriller films
German political thriller films
West German films
1980s German-language films
Films set in Berlin
Films directed by Bernhard Sinkel
1980s German films